The Texas spotted whiptail (Aspidoscelis gularis) is a species of long-tailed lizard, in the family Teiidae. The species is endemic to the south central and southwestern United States and northern Mexico. Six subspecies are recognized as being valid.

Geographic range
A. gularis is found in New Mexico, Oklahoma, and Texas, and in the Mexican states of Aguascalientes, Campeche, Coahuila, Guanajuato, Hidalgo, Jalisco, Michoacán, Nuevo León, Querétaro, San Luis Potosí, Tamaulipas, and Veracruz.

Description

It is typically a tan brown or green-brown in color, with a pattern of seven distinct grey or white stripes that run the length of the body, and stop at the tail, with light colored spots along the sides. The underside is uniformly white in color. Males often have a red-colored throat, blue belly, and black or blue patches on the chest, while females have only a pink-colored throat. The tail is long compared to the body, usually close to three times the body length. The tail is usually a uniform peach or tan color.

Behavior and habitat
A. gularis is diurnal and insectivorous. It is highly active and found in a wide variety of habitats, from grassland and semi-arid regions, to canyons and rocky terrain, typically not far from a permanent water source.

Reproduction
Breeding of sexually mature A. gularis occurs in the spring, and a clutch of 1-5 eggs is laid in the early summer.

Subspecies
Six subspecies of the Texas spotted whiptail, including the nominotypical subspecies, are recognized as being valid.

Aspidoscelis gularis gularis 
Aspidoscelis gularis colossus 
Aspidoscelis gularis pallidus 
Aspidoscelis gularis rauni 
Aspidoscelis gularis semiannulatus 
Aspidoscelis gularis semifasciatus 

Nota bene: A trinomial authority in parentheses indicates that the subspecies was originally described in a genus other than Aspidoscelis.

Etymology
The subspecific name, rauni, is in honor of American zoologist Gerald George Raun (born 1932).

References

Further reading
Baird SF, Girard CF (1852). "Characteristics of some New Reptiles in the Museum of the Smithsonian Institution". Proc. Acad. Nat. Sci. Philadelphia 6: 125–129. (Cnemidophorus gularis, new species, p. 128).
Powell R, Conant R, Collins JT (2016). Peterson Field Guide to Reptiles and Amphibians of Eastern and Central North America, Fourth Edition. Boston and New York: Houghton Mifflin Harcourt. xiv + 494 pp., 207 Figures, 47 Plates. . (Aspidoscelis gularis, pp. 315-316 + Plate 31).
Reeder TW, Cole CJ, Dessauer HC (2002). "Phylogenetic relationships of whiptail lizards of the genus Cnemidophorus (Squamata: Teiidae): a test of monophyly, reevaluation of karyotypic evolution, and review of hybrid origins". American Museum Novitates (3365): 1-61. (Aspidoscelis gularis, new combination, p. 22).
Smith HM, Brodie ED Jr (1978). Reptiles of North America: A Guide to Field Identification. New York: Golden Press. 240 pp.  (paperback),  (hardcover). (Cnemidophorus gularis, pp. 96–97).

External links

Herps of Texas: Cnemidophorus gularis 

Aspidoscelis
Reptiles of the United States
Fauna of Northeastern Mexico
Reptiles of Mexico
Reptiles described in 1852
Taxa named by Spencer Fullerton Baird
Taxa named by Charles Frédéric Girard